Albert "Bert" D. Friesen,  (born May 19, 1947) is a Canadian involved in biotechnology, innovation. His biotechnology career began as the first full-time employee and became the President CEO of The Winnipeg Rh Institute where he led the development of WinRho, one of Canada's first successful biotech products.

References

1947 births
Living people
People from Pembina Valley Region, Manitoba
Canadian Mennonites
Biotechnologists
University of Manitoba alumni
Members of the Order of Manitoba